Château Fougas is a château in Gironde, Nouvelle-Aquitaine, France. It was built in the 18th century. They currently make wines.

References

Fougas